The Osnabrück Uplands, Osnabrück Hills or, less commonly, Osnabrück Hill Country ( or Osnabrücker Bergland), are the low hills, or Hügelland, rarely over , in the northwest of the Lower Saxon Hills near Osnabrück in Germany. They are bounded by the Wiehen Hills to the north and the Teutoburg Forest to the south. Regionally, especially in tourism, they are often referred to locally as the Osnabrücker Bergland, however this is usually not a precisely defined physical landscape, but refers to an area roughly comprising the municipal boundaries of Osnabrück and a narrow radius around the city. By contrast the natural region major unit known as the Osnabrücker Hügelland extends from north-west of Ibbenbüren to the Melle Hills north of Melle, behind which is their south-eastern continuation, the Ravensberg Hills.

The Osnabrück Uplands form the heart of the cultural region of Osnabrück Land. The unpopulated areas of the region, which covers 748.5 km2, are a central part of the TERRA.vita Nature and Geopark.

Natural regions 
The Osnabrück Uplands are divided from north (west to east) to south (west to east) as follows:
(to Lower Saxon Hills)
535 Osnabrück Uplands (Osnabrücker Hügelland)
535.2 Achmer Foreland (Achmer Vorland) (western north)
535.20 Neuenkirchen Plateau (Neuenkirchener Platte) (western north)
535.21 Gehn (eastern north)
535.22 Vinter Lowlands (Vinter Niederungen) (central north)
535.23 Wallenbrock Lowlands (Wallenbrocker Niederungen) (west)
535.24 Seeste Plateau (Seester Platte( (centre)
535.25 Halener Sande (east)
535.0 Northern Osnabrück Uplands (Nördliches Osnabrücker Hügelland) (north)
535.01 Barlager Sande (west)
535.00 Wallenhorst Uplands (Wallenhorster Bergland) (north)
535.02 Schledehausen Hills (Schledehauser Hügelland) (centre)
535.03 Melle Heights (Meller Höhen) (with Melle Hills, southeast)
535.3 Western Osnabrück Uplands Westliches Osnabrücker Hügelland (west)
535.30 Westerkappelen Hill Country Westerkappelner Flachwellenland (north)
535.31 Mettingen Foreland (Mettinger Vorland) (northwest)
535.32 Schafberg Plateau (Schafbergplatte) (west)
535.33 Ibbenbüren Basin (Ibbenbürener Senke) (western south)
535.34 |Habichtswald (central south)
535.35 Leeden Basin (Leedener Senke) (eastern south)
535.1 Haseniederung 
535.10 Halen Depression (Halener Niederung)
535.11 Osnabruck Depression (Osnabrücker Niederung)
535.4 Southern Osnabrück Uplands (Südliches Osnabrücker Hügelland) (south)
535.40 Holte Uplands (Holter Hügel- und Bergland)
535.41 Ösede Basin (Öseder Mulde)
(to 534.0 Ohrbeck Heights = Dörenberg and its northwestern outliers)
534.00 Hüggel, berge

Hills 
Among the most important high points in the Osnabruck Uplands are  the following – sorted by height in metres (m) above sea level (NHN):
 Hesterbrink (Moselerberg; ca. 232,5 m), highest point in Melle 
 Holzhauser Berg (ca. 227 m), source of the River Hunte near Melle-Oldendorf
 Hüggel (226 m)
 Melle Hills (just under 220 m), eastern end of the uplands
 Moselerberg (207.5 m), 
 Oldendorfer Berg (203.2 m) with the Melle Observatory in Melle-Oberholsten
 Westerhauser Berg (192.5 m)
 Holter Berg (190.1 m) with Holt Castle
 Piesberg (188 m) with the Museum of Industrial Culture (focal point: coal mining)
 Schafbergplatte (176.1 m) in Ibbenbüren, western end of the uplands
 Osterberg (173 m)
 Große Egge (166 m)
 Selberg (165.3 m)
 Großer Zuschlag (154.9 m)
 Im Kassel (153 m)
 Werscher Berg (148 m)
 Lechtenbrink (146 m)
 Harderberg (145.2 m)
 Hengelsberg (145.2 m)
 Dingelrott (141.2 m)
 Wellinger Berg (136 m)
 Halterdaren (134.3 m)
 Halter Berg (127.5 m)
 Gattberg (127.1 m) with the Steinernes Meer Nature Reserve
 Schölerberg (126) with Osnabrück Zoo
 Alt-Schlederhauser Berg (124.8 m)
 Schinkelberg (123.1 m) with the Schinkel Tower
 Haster Berg (121 m)
 Kleeberg (119.7 m)
 Hanfelder Hügel (115.5) with the Wittekindsburg

References

Literature 
 Roman-Germanic Central Museum, Mainz (publ.): Führer zu vor- und frühgeschichtlichen Denkmälern – Das Osnabrücker Land I, Vol. 42, Verlag Philipp von Zabern, Mainz, 1979,

External links 
Landscape fact file by the BfN (here the area of the conurbation of Osnabrück is not included)

Central Uplands
Hill ranges of Lower Saxony
Osnabrück (district)
!